Real Education: Four Simple Truths for Bringing America's Schools Back to Reality is a 2008 book by Charles Murray. He wrote the book to challenge the "Educational romanticism [which] asks too much from students at the bottom of the intellectual pile, asks the wrong things from those in the middle, and asks too little from those at the top."

Murray claims that there are "four simple truths" about education:
 "Ability varies."
 "Half of the children are below average."
 "Too many people are going to college."
 "America's future depends on how we educate the academically gifted."

Critic Michael J. Feuer, writing in Issues in Science and Technology, in addition to Murray's "four simple truths", sees "an equally simplistic proposal:... [that] privatization will fix the schools."

When New York Times interviewer Deborah Solomon said, "I believe that given the opportunity, most people could do most anything," Murray responded, "You're out of touch with reality in that regard."

Times critic Charles McGrath defends the current educational system: 

President of St. John's College, Annapolis, Christopher B. Nelson, in what he called his "version of educational romanticism," agreed with some of Murray's premises but challenged his conclusions:

See also
 Academically Adrift
 In the Basement of the Ivory Tower
 UnCollege

References

External links
 
 

2008 non-fiction books
Books by Charles Murray
Books about education
Race and education in the United States
Race and intelligence controversy